Portwood is an area of Stockport, England, just east of the town centre along Great Portwood Street. The part closest to the town centre contains Meadow Mill and is mainly given over to shops (including the Peel Centre); the outer part is residential. The River Tame and Goyt and M60 motorway run through the area.

The site of the former Portwood railway station lies under the M60 motorway.

References

Areas of Stockport